Wonderstrands refers to the Furðustrandir, a stretch of coastline mentioned in the Icelandic Eiríks saga, relating the deeds of Erik the Red. It was reported to be located north of Straumfjörð and south of Kjalarnes promontory.

Some believe that it refers to the extended beaches located on the coast of Labrador, province of Newfoundland and Labrador, Canada. In The Vinland Sagas and the Actual Characteristics of Eastern Canada, Swedish archaeologist Mats G. Larsson references philologist Jan Paul Strid and puts forward that a more modern translation of Furðustrandir and examination of the sagas may put the Wonderstrands between Gabarus Bay and St. Peter’s Bay, Cape Breton Island, Nova Scotia, Canada.

The name
The first element in the Norse name is the genitive form of furða "wonder, astonishment"; the adjective furðuligr has the meaning "strange". This word is not used or found in other place names from Norse times.

Location according to the saga
According to Sephton’s 1880 translation of the saga, the Wonderstrands was beyond Helluland, Markland and Kjalarnes, but north of Straumfjörð and Hóp.

One version of the saga of Erik the Red accounts the location thus, starting from Vestribygd (probably Western Settlement):

Suggested locations

There is no popular or scholarly agreement on the exact location of the Wonderstrands, and Fridtjof Nansen and Helge Ingstad held that the Saga of Erik the Red in general could not be trusted. The suggestions that have been made, however, place the Wonderstrands from southern Labrador to coastlines beyond Cape Cod. It would appear that the lion's share of estimates that have been made suggest a stretch of coast somewhere to the south of Cape Breton Island, Nova Scotia; nearly all conceive the Wonderstrands to be somewhere south of the Strait of Belle Isle.

The most recent estimate, backed by archeological findings of pitfall traps as well as by geographical observations, was presented in a 2012 article by Jónas Kristjánsson. He suggests that the Wonderstrands refers to the coastline between L'Anse aux Meadows and Sop's Bay, on Newfoundland.

See also
 Vinland
 Vinland sagas

References

External links
 Picture of beach
 Beaches of Southeast Cape Breton
 Cape Gabarus as Kjalarnes

Geography of Newfoundland and Labrador
Geography of Nova Scotia
Viking Age populated places
Norse colonization of North America
Saga locations